Hermann II may refer to:

 Hermann II, Duke of Swabia (died in 1003)
 Herman II (Archbishop of Cologne) (995–1056)
 Hermann II, Count Palatine of Lotharingia (1049–1085)
 Herman II, Margrave of Baden (died in 1130)
 Herman II, Count of Winzenburg (died 1152)
 Hermann II, Lord of Lippe (1196–1229)
 Hermann II, Landgrave of Thuringia (1222–1241)
 Hermann II von Buxhoeveden (1163–1248) 
 Hermann II, Landgrave of Hesse (1341–1413)
 Hermann II, Count of Celje (ca. 1365–1435)
 Hermann II of Dorpat (died in 1563)